"Hey Mama" is a song recorded by French record producer David Guetta featuring Trinidadian rapper Nicki Minaj, American singer Bebe Rexha and co-production by Dutch record producer Afrojack. The song was released on 16 March 2015, as the fourth single from Guetta's sixth studio album, Listen (2014). It was produced by David Guetta, Afrojack, and Giorgio Tuinfort, who also wrote the song with Rexha, Minaj, Ester Dean, and Sean Douglas. American ethnomusicologist Alan Lomax is also credited as a writer, as the track samples his recording of "Rosie", a field holler sung by an Afro-American chain gang at the Mississippi State Penitentiary.

The song peaked at number eight on the Billboard Hot 100 in the United States, and peaked within the top 10 in numerous countries including Australia, Austria, Belgium, Canada, Finland, France, Germany, Hungary, Ireland, Israel, Lebanon, the Netherlands, New Zealand, Scotland, Spain, Sweden, Switzerland, and the United Kingdom.

Background and composition
The artists co-wrote the song with Ester Dean, Sean Douglas, and Giorgio Tuinfort; the latter co-produced it with Guetta and Afrojack. The intro and post-chorus features a prominent sample from "Rosie", an Alan Lomax recording from the 1940s.

Rexha explained to Billboard why she wasn't initially credited as a featured artist on the track: "We talked about it - I actually emailed Guetta about it. I really wanted to be featured on it, because, you know, I've been signed and dropped, and now signed a second time, so it's been hard. What ended up happening was that it looked like a lot of names on the title, so they wanted to keep as many low features as possible. That's what I was told, and it makes sense to me. I guess more than two [featured] names doesn't look good on the radio. It's tough hearing your voice on the radio, on a chorus, and knowing that people think it's another artist." As of June 2015, Rexha is officially credited in all instances of the song's mention.

"Hey Mama" is the third collaboration between Guetta and Minaj, following Nothing but the Beat singles "Where Them Girls At" (which features Minaj and Flo Rida) (2011) and the double-platinum "Turn Me On" (2011).

According to the sheet music published at Musicnotes.com, "Hey Mama" is written in the key of E minor with a tempo of 86 beats per minute.  The vocals in the song span from A3 to E5.

Critical reception
"Hey Mama" was well received by critics, with many praising the discothèque nature of the song. Bianca Gracie of Idolator described it as "a crazed electro-house/trap sound", noting Minaj's "rap flow into a island-tinged romp." It was described by Direct Lyrics as an "intelligently-produced radio-friendly EDM-island sound", whilst Richard Baxter of Popology Now complimented the track's electronic styles, describing Bebe Rexha as the "star" of "Hey Mama" with her "hook heavy chorus".

Several music companies and reviewers chose "Hey Mama" as the highlight of the album, with Billboard describing it as a "bombastic island-flavored jam" and the Associated Press stating Minaj and Afrojack had produced "a startling R&B bump and funk gem." Minaj, in particular, received positive reviews for her vocals, with Newsday calling the track Minaj's "most undeniable hit" since her song "Super Bass", and The Guardian describing Minaj's vocals as a highlight from the album.

The song's lyrics, on the other hand, have been subject to criticism from feminist media, with many of them calling the lyrics sexist. Katie Barnes of Feministing described the song's second verse ("Yes I do the cooking/ Yes I do the cleaning/ Plus I keep the na-na real sweet for your eating/ Yes you be the boss and yes I be respecting / Whatever that you tell me cause it's game you be spitting") as "pretty terrible," stating that, "It doesn’t matter if the verse is accompanied by a bumpin’ beat, the lyrics still present a retro ideal of what a woman should be and how she should treat her man." Katherine Burks of The Lala called the lyrics "horribly misogynistic bullshit."  Alex Kritselis of Bustle found the lyrics "seriously groan-inducing," noting that "the whole 'I'll do whatever you want, whenever you want' vibe" made him "more than a little uneasy."

Commercial performance

The song peaked at number eight on the Billboard Hot 100, becoming Guetta's sixth top 10 in the US, also making Minaj's 12, Afrojack's second since Pitbull's "Give Me Everything", and Rexha's first as a singer but her second as a writer after the number one Billboard Hot 100 hit "The Monster" by Eminem featuring Rihanna. It spent six weeks in the top 10 of the Billboard Hot 100 chart. "Hey Mama" spent five weeks within the top 10 of the UK Singles Chart. The song rose to number 10 and remained there for four weeks until it peaked at number nine. It peaked at number two in the UK R&B Chart.

Music video
The official video (directed by John Ryan) was released on 19 May 2015. The video begins with Guetta walking through a desert with a group of people to find a machine inside the box. Scenes of a holographic Minaj intercut the video while other scenes include other people being shrouded in curtains and dancing while during the chorus, Guetta and the others are seen driving in their vehicles through the desert. During the chorus and bridge, everyone dances while Minaj raps. Meanwhile, a screen plays various clips of natural scenes, such as bolts of lightning and a swarm of sharks swimming. The video ends with people walking through and sitting around a neon heart light and one last shot of the holographic Minaj, before cutting to Guetta standing in the desert. Afrojack also appears in the video.

As of August 2019, the video has received over 1.4 billion views. It is Guetta's and Rexha's most viewed video, and Minaj's fourth.

Live performances
On 17 May 2015, Guetta and Minaj performed the song for the first time on 2015 Billboard Music Awards along with "The Night Is Still Young". On 30 May 2015, Minaj and Rexha also performed the song together for the first time on the iHeartRadio Summer Pool Party 2015 in Las Vegas, joined by Guetta on stage.

Track listing

Charts

Weekly charts

Year-end charts

Decade-end charts

Certifications

Release history

Awards and nominations

References

2014 songs
2015 singles
David Guetta songs
Nicki Minaj songs
Bebe Rexha songs
Afrojack songs
Atlantic Records singles
Parlophone singles
Music videos directed by Hannah Lux Davis
Songs written by David Guetta
Songs written by Giorgio Tuinfort
Songs written by Nicki Minaj
Songs written by Ester Dean
Songs written by Sean Douglas (songwriter)
Songs written by Bebe Rexha
Songs written by Afrojack
Number-one singles in Greece
Song recordings produced by David Guetta
Number-one singles in Poland
Trap music (EDM) songs